Roads or The Roads (Russian: Дороги) is a Soviet WWII song by Anatoly Novikov to lyrics by the poet Lev Ivanovich Oshanin. The song is one of the best-known works of the composer, having been popularised by both ensembles carrying the name of the Red Army Choir, namely the Alexandrov Ensemble and MVD Ensemble. Novikov and Oshanin were members of a military troupe at the front and the song was composed under artillery fire at Zhizdra. Among those who have recorded the song are Muslim Magomayev, Ivan Rebroff (1986), Dmitri Hvorostovsky on the war songs album Where Are You My Brothers, and the Choir of Sretensky Monastery. The song begins "Ah roads.." («Эх, дороги…») and is not to be confused with another Red Army Choir favourite "На дороге" ("On the road") or "Гей, по дороге!" ("Hey, on the road!").

Lyrics

References

Songs about roads
1945 songs
Russian military songs
Soviet songs